1971 in professional wrestling describes the year's events in the world of professional wrestling.

List of notable promotions 
Only one promotion held notable shows in 1971.

Calendar of notable shows

Championship changes

EMLL

Births
Date of birth uncertain:
Bob Starr 
Billy Wiles 
January 1 - Rodney
January 7 - CW Anderson 
January 28 - Yuji Yasuraoka
 February 10 
 Louie Spicolli (d. 1998)
 Victoria 
 February 14 
 Tommy Dreamer
 Nelson Frazier, Jr. (d. 2014)
 February 22 – Super Caló 
 February 25 - Sean O'Haire (died in 2014) 
 February 28 - David Khakhaleishvili (died in 2021) 
 March 1 
Scotty Riggs 
Yar (died in 2021) 
 March 2 
 Manami Toyota
 Satoru Asako 
 March 6 – Val Venis
 March 9 - Tiger Ali Singh 
 March 10 - Debbie Malenko 
 March 11 - Johnny Knoxville 
 March 18 - Mike Bell (d. 2008)  
 March 23 - Hiroyoshi Tenzan 
 April 4 - John Zandig
 April 16 - Krusher Kong 
 April 21 – Axl Rotten (d. 2016)
 May 7 - L.A. Smooth 
 May 12 – Doug Basham
 May 18 - Cynthia Lynch 
 May 19 – Psicosis
 May 22 – Halloween
 May 28 – Mosh
 June 5 - Glen Osbourne 
 June 12 – Mark Henry
 June 15 – Chuck Palumbo
 June 18 
Melissa Coates (died in 2021)
Chasity 
 July 1 – Abismo Negro (d. 2009)
 July 5:
Cousin Sal 
Jamie Dundee
 July 7 - Allan Funk 
 July 14  
Bubba Ray Dudley
Joey Styles 
 July 15 - Pequeño Olímpico
 July 17 - Alexander Otsuka 
 July 19 - Michael Modest 
 August 5 - Hideki Hosaka (d. 2021)
 August 10 - Kevin Randleman (d.2016)
 August 25 – Crash Holly (d. 2003)
 September 1 - Sim Snuka 
 September 8 - David Arquette 
 September 12 – Shocker
 September 16 - Richard Slinger 
 September 22 - Luther Reigns 
 September 23 - Osamu Nishimura
 October 8 - Al Katrazz 
 October 9 – Stevie Richards
 October 15 - Joey Abs 
 October 19 – Sweet Saraya
 October 22 – Adam Flash
 October 24 - Dale Torborg 
 November 1 - Kamikaze
 November 23 - Tetsuhiro Kuroda 
 November 24 - Sumie Sakai 
 December 1 - Trinity 
 December 24 - Oro (d. 1993)

Debuts
Uncertain debut date
Afa Anoa'i
Gran Hamada
Jean Gagne
Hillbilly Jim
Ron Bass 
Tiger Conway Jr.
 May 9 - Tatsumi Fujinami
 June 21 - Kendo Nagasaki
 August 20 - Tinieblas
 September 16 - El Signo
 October 1 - Mano Negra

Retirements
 Whipper Billy Watson (1940 – 1971)

Deaths
 May 12 - Tor Johnson, 67
 June 17 - Alberto Torres, 37
 July 12 – Yvon Robert, 56
 July 24 – Hercules Cortez, 39
 October 29 - Harry Light, 73

References

 
professional wrestling